Paranormal Activity: The Marked Ones is a 2014 American found footage supernatural horror film written and directed by Christopher Landon. Released on January 3, 2014, in the United States, it is the fifth installment of the Paranormal Activity film series. It is also Landon's second directorial film, after Burning Palms. Paranormal Activity: The Marked Ones received mixed reviews from critics and grossed $90 million worldwide.

Plot
In June 2012, 18-year-old high school graduate Jesse Arista lives with his father Cesar, sister Evette, and grandmother Irma in Oxnard, California. In the apartment below lives a mysterious woman named Ana Sanchez, who everyone believes to be a witch. When Ana is found murdered, Jesse and his best friend Hector Estrella spot classmate Oscar Lopez running from the scene. The two investigate the apartment where they find black magic items, VHS tapes, and a journal of spells that can "open doorways to unholy places".

After Jesse, Hector and their friend Marisol Vargas try out a ritual, paranormal occurrences take place in Jesse's apartment. One night, the trio communicates with an unknown entity through a game. Jesse finds a mysterious bite mark on his arm and discovers he has superhuman abilities such as enhanced strength and levitation. At a party, Jesse takes a girl to Ana's apartment to have sex and encounters Oscar, who scares the girl away, and has black eyes and the same bite mark on his arm. Oscar tells Jesse that it's only a matter of time before "something inside them" will take over, and they will harm those they love before disappearing. Oscar dies by suicide by jumping off a building.

The group discovers a trapdoor in Ana's apartment, where they find a witch altar and photos of Jesse, his pregnant mother, Ana, Oscar, and Lois. Jesse is lured to the trapdoor one night and encounters the younger versions of Katie and Kristi, both with black eyes, before being attacked by an unknown force.

Jesse gradually becomes dark, suicidal, and violent, which disturbs Hector and Marisol, who meet Arturo, Oscar's criminal brother. Arturo tells them that Oscar was in contact with Ali Rey, who had researched demons after her father Daniel and step-mother Kristi were killed and half-brother kidnapped by a possessed Katie. Ali tells them that Jesse has been "marked" by a worldwide coven of witches called "The Midwives", who have been brainwashing women to give up their firstborn sons to create an army of possessed young men. Ali gives them an address to where a final ritual is supposed to take place and warns that Jesse will no longer exist if the demon fully consumes him and the ritual is completed.

Irma is pushed down the stairs by Jesse and taken to a hospital. Jesse attacks Hector, but Marisol knocks him unconscious. As they are attempting to leave, a van smashes into their car, and Jesse is kidnapped. Hector and Marisol, Arturo, and his friend Santo go to the address, which turns out to be Lois' house. In the garden, coven members rush in to attack but Arturo shoots them as Hector and Marisol run inside leaving Arturo's fate unknown. They find Santo dead and Marisol is also killed. Hector runs into a figure resembling Ana and is chased by a possessed Jesse. He flees into a room and shuts the door but Jesse breaks it down, forcing Hector to go through a strangely marked brown door.

The door he went through sends Hector back in time to the household of Katie and Micah. Hector sees Katie going to the kitchen. After unsuccessfully attempting to get her attention, Katie turns around to see Hector and screams for Micah, who assumes Hector is an intruder and tackles him, but Katie violently stabs Micah to death with a kitchen knife, which is how the first film ends. Hector tries to flee the house, only to be attacked and presumably killed by a demonic Jesse, as the camera drops to the floor. After a moment of total silence, a witch picks up the camera and turns it off.

Cast

Production

Development and writing
The film was set to take place in June 2012 but announced in April 2012, and was first teased in the post-credits scene of Paranormal Activity 4, a scene only presented in theaters. Though the film is targeted to the Latino market, most of its dialogue is not in Spanish. Christopher Landon, who wrote the screenplay for 2007's Disturbia, as well as the three Paranormal Activity sequels, was announced to write and direct the project, which has been described as a "cousin" or "ese" to the series as opposed to a direct sequel, prequel, or reboot. The film maintains the look of found footage, a style used throughout the Paranormal Activity series.

Filming
Filming finished in late July, after producer Jason Blum confirmed that the film was almost finished shooting. This resulted in the film getting its release date pushed from October 25, 2013, to January 3, 2014.

Release

Theatrical
Paranormal Activity: The Marked Ones was released on January 3, 2014, in U.S., Mexican, and Canadian theaters. The release date was pushed to January due to its longer and larger production.

Home media
An unrated/extended version, along with the theatrical cut, of The Marked Ones was released on DVD, Blu-ray and Digital HD on April 8, 2014. The unrated cut is roughly 17 minutes longer. The DVD premiere of the film in Hungary was on May 7, 2014.

Reception

Box office
Despite predictions suggesting that The Marked Ones would open at #1 in its debut weekend, the film took a close second to Frozen (in its seventh week) with $18,343,611 at the North American box office.

By the end of its theatrical run, The Marked Ones grossed $32.5 million in North America and $58.4 million in other territories for a worldwide total of $90.9 million.

Critical response
On Rotten Tomatoes, the film has an approval rating of 39%, based on 83 reviews with an average score of 4.70/10. The site's consensus states: "A change of setting breathes some new life into the franchise, but Paranormal Activity: The Marked Ones fails to provide enough consistent thrills to justify a fifth film in the series". On Metacritic, the film has a score of 42 out of 100, based on 19 reviews, indicating "mixed or average reviews".

The change of setting and tone was primarily praised by critics. Mark Olsen of the Los Angeles Times praised the film, saying that it "feels like a fresh start". Variety critic Andrew Barker celebrated the "welcome diversity and humor" of the film as did Richard Corliss of Time magazine who summarized that the film "provided the familiar cheap thrills but with a salsa tang." Filmink Magazine critic Eden Caceda applauded the humor and action, but claimed that the spinoff "lacks the memorable scares required for this to rate any higher than an above average horror film."

Eric Goldman of IGN wrote that "The Marked Ones is another enjoyable chapter", while HorrorNews.net praised the lead characters, writing "With an appealing pair of friends in the lead, [the film] provides the audience with a cast that they can root for, care for and fear for which serves the story and the series well".

Evan Dickson of Bloody Disgusting was the first to give his impressions on the film, giving it a positive review of 4/5. Stating, "Fun, scary and remarkably cinematic within the found footage conceit, The Marked Ones might be the first Paranormal Activity movie that feels like an event film while you're watching it". Dickson also stated that it was "neck and neck with Paranormal Activity 3".

Sequel

Paranormal Activity: The Marked Ones was followed by Paranormal Activity: The Ghost Dimension, released in 3D on October 23, 2015.

References

External links
 (Archived)

Paranormal Activity (film series)
2014 horror films
2014 psychological thriller films
American supernatural horror films
Camcorder films
Demons in film
Hood films
Film spin-offs
Films directed by Christopher B. Landon
Films produced by Jason Blum
Films set in 2012
Films set in 2006
Films about time travel
Interquel films
American haunted house films
Blumhouse Productions films
Paramount Pictures films
Films about witchcraft
Films with screenplays by Christopher B. Landon
2010s English-language films
2010s American films
Found footage films